The mel scale (after the word  melody) is a perceptual scale of pitches judged by listeners to be equal in distance from one another. The reference point between this scale and normal frequency measurement is defined by assigning a perceptual pitch of 1000 mels to a 1000 Hz tone, 40 dB above the listener's threshold. Above about 500 Hz, increasingly large intervals are judged by listeners to produce equal pitch increments.

Formula
A formula to convert f hertz into m mels is:

History and other formulas

The formula from O'Shaughnessy's book can be expressed with different logarithmic bases:

The corresponding inverse expressions are:

There were published curves and tables on psychophysical pitch scales since Steinberg's 1937 
curves based on just-noticeable differences of pitch.  More curves soon followed in Fletcher and Munson's 1937 
and Fletcher's 1938
and Stevens' 1937 and Stevens and Volkmann's 1940
papers using a variety of experimental methods and analysis approaches.

In 1949 Koenig published an approximation based on separate linear and logarithmic segments, with a break at 1000 Hz.

Gunnar Fant proposed the current popular linear/logarithmic formula in 1949, but with the 1000 Hz corner frequency.

An alternate expression of the formula, not depending on choice of logarithm base, is noted in Fant (1968):

In 1976, Makhoul and Cosell published the now-popular version with the 700 Hz corner frequency.
As Ganchev et al. have observed, "The formulae [with 700], when compared to [Fant's with 1000], provide a 
closer approximation of the Mel scale for frequencies below 1000 Hz, at the price of higher inaccuracy for frequencies higher than 1000 Hz."  Above 7 kHz, however, the situation is reversed, and the 700 Hz version again fits better.

Data by which some of these formulas are motivated are tabulated in Beranek (1949), as measured from the curves of Stevens and Volkmann:

A formula with a break frequency of 625 Hz is given by Lindsay & Norman (1977); the formula does not appear in their 1972 first edition:

For direct comparison with other formulae, this is equivalent to:

Most mel-scale formulas give exactly 1000 mels at 1000 Hz.  The break frequency (e.g. 700 Hz, 1000 Hz, or 625 Hz) is the only free parameter in the usual form of the formula.  Some non-mel auditory-frequency-scale formulas use the same form but with much lower break frequency, not necessarily mapping to 1000 at 1000 Hz; for example the ERB-rate scale of Glasberg & Moore (1990) uses a break point of 228.8 Hz, and the cochlear frequency–place map of Greenwood (1990) uses 165.3 Hz.

Other functional forms for the mel scale have been explored by Umesh et al.; they point out that the traditional formulas with a logarithmic region and a linear region do not fit the data from Stevens and Volkmann's curves as well as some other forms, based on the following data table of measurements that they made from those curves:

Criticism
Stevens' student, Donald D. Greenwood, who had worked on the mel scale experiments in 1956, considers the scale biased by experimental flaws. In 2009 he posted to a mailing list,

See also
Bark scale
Mel-frequency cepstrum
Fletcher–Munson curves

References

External links

Handbook for Acoustic Ecology

Scales
Psychoacoustics